Mimi Kuzyk (born February 21, 1952) is a Canadian actress.

Early life
Kuzyk was born in Winnipeg, Manitoba to Fred and Kay Kuzyk, both of whom are Ukrainian immigrants, and received her early education at the Immaculate Heart of Mary School. She danced with the Rusalka Ukrainian dance group in Winnipeg for 12 years and briefly studied jazz dance at the Royal Winnipeg Ballet School.

Career
Kuzyk's film debut was in the 1984 film, He's Fired, She's Hired. Since then, she has had roles in numerous films and television series. Mimi is most noted for playing Detective Patsy Mayo on Hill Street Blues from 1984 to 1986. Kuzyk received a Genie Award nomination for her work in the 2001 Canadian drama Lost and Delirious, and Gemini Award nominations for Best Supporting Actress. In 2001 she was selected to be the parade marshal for the Bloor West Village Ukrainian Festival in Toronto, Ontario.

Kuzyk has also appeared on Murder, She Wrote, Quantum Leap, Doogie Howser, M.D., The Chris Isaak Show, Alfred Hitchcock Presents, L.A. Law, The Love Boat, Remington Steele, Second City Television, Danger Bay, The Ray Bradbury Theater, Instant Star, Traders, Blue Murder, Total Recall 2070, NCIS, Kung Fu: The Legend Continues, and The Outer Limits.

Personal life
, Kuzyk was married to Greek-born carpenter Manoli and has a daughter Kaliopi.

Filmography

Film

Television

Video games

References

External links
 

1952 births
Canadian film actresses
Canadian television actresses
Canadian voice actresses
Living people
Actresses from Winnipeg
Canadian people of Ukrainian descent
20th-century Canadian actresses
21st-century Canadian actresses